(born December 12, 1966), better known as , is a Japanese professional wrestler and actor currently signed to Dragon Gate where he acts as an in-ring talent, trainer and senior advisor. In addition to having trained in Japan, Asai learned to wrestle in the lucha libre style while working in Mexico. He is credited with popularizing the "Asai Moonsault".

On October 11, 1996, Asai won the J-Crown, a unification of eight lower weight division titles from various international promotions. At the time, he already held the NWA World Middleweight Championship; during this reign he also became the WCW Cruiserweight Champion, making him the most decorated wrestler in history. From December 29, 1996, through January 4, 1997, he concurrently held ten titles, a record which still stands. From 2013 until 2019, he competed primarily for All Japan Pro Wrestling (AJPW) as a freelancer. In 2019, he joined Dragongate as a senior advisor and wrestler.

Professional wrestling career

Early years (1987–1996)

Asai trained in the New Japan Pro-Wrestling (NJPW) dojo in 1987, but was not drafted up by the promotion due to his small size. He moved to Mexico where he joined the Universal Wrestling Association and subsequently won the UWA World Welterweight Championship in 1988. In March 1990, he joined the Universal Wrestling Federation in Japan. He also competed in the Universal Lucha Libre promotion founded by his mentor Gran Hamada.

In 1991, he signed with the Mexican Consejo Mundial de Lucha Libre (CMLL) promotion. In CMLL, he adopted the Último Dragón mask and persona. "Último Dragón", which means "Last Dragon" in Spanish, was initially a gimmick that saw Asai claiming to be the last student taught by legendary martial artist Bruce Lee, whose nickname was "The Dragon". The gimmick was later dropped, but the name remained. Late in 1992,  Misteriosito was turned into "Último Dragoncito", a Mini-Estrella version of Asai. During the same period, Asai also signed with the Japanese WAR promotion, and due to co-promoting, he was able to wrestle for NJPW. In Japan, he became IWGP Junior heavyweight champion twice, and in Mexico, he held various titles. In later years, he wrestled for AAA.

World Championship Wrestling (1996–1998)
Asai made his American debut for the World Championship Wrestling (WCW) promotion in 1996 initially under the mistranslated name "Ultimate Dragon". He was referred to by this name for over a year in WCW until they reverted to using his Spanish ring name. He quickly was pushed into the lime-light of the WCW Cruiserweight division with Sonny Onoo as his manager. He was instantly a heel based upon the fact he was Japanese and Sonny Onoo was his manager. He made his WCW pay-per view debut in 1996's Hog Wild against Rey Misterio Jr. for the WCW Cruiserweight Championship but lost. He got back the win at WCW World War 3 when he returned to WCW as the J-Crown champion. He then feuded with Dean Malenko for the WCW Cruiserweight title which he won at Starrcade 1996.

Dragon later dropped the WCW Cruiserweight title back to Malenko but his stock was rising as he won the WCW World Television Championship from Prince Iaukea but lost it to Steven Regal. He then turned face by dropping Onoo as his manager and won back the WCW World Television title from Regal before losing to Alex Wright at Clash of the Champions XXXV. He would then win the WCW Cruiserweight title one last time from Eddie Guerrero, before losing the title on the first WCW Thunder to Juventud Guerrera. He then suffered an arm injury in 1998 that required surgery. The operation was botched, causing nerve damage. It was thought that this would force an end of his career and he announced his retirement.

Toryumon (1997–2003)
In 1997, Asai then became a trainer and founded the Último Dragón Gym, where he trained three classes of students, "Toryumon Japan", "Toryumon 2000 Project" (T2P), and "Toryumon X". His first class of students, which included Don Fuji, Dragon Kid, Magnum Tokyo, Cima and Suwa, worked for WCW early in their career. In 1998, Asai began co-promoting Grupo Internacional Revolución (IWRG) based out of Mexico, where he trained several of the top young wrestlers. In 1999, a promotion named Toryumon opened, with the vast majority of the roster having been trained by Asai. Toryumon was later renamed Dragon Gate as Asai parted ways with the promotion. He continued to train students at his gym.

In 2002, Asai underwent another surgery to repair the damage done to his arm in hopes of returning to wrestling. In late 2002 Ultimo Dragon was in talks with World Wrestling Entertainment for another shot at a United States run. To get back into ring shape he returned to action for his T2P and Toryumon Mexico promotions. On November 26, he teamed with former WCW wrestlers Norman Smiley and Perry Saturn in a win against Masaaki Mochizuki, Kenichiro Arai and Toru Owashi for T2P. On December 7 he teamed with Mochizuki and Dragon Kid in a win over the team of Bestia Salvaje, Scorpio Jr. and El Duende for Toryumon Mexico.

World Wrestling Entertainment (2003–2004)
In the spring of 2003, he signed with World Wrestling Entertainment as the Último Dragón, seeking to realize his two lifelong goals of competing in Madison Square Garden and performing at WrestleMania. He was brought in on the heels of the signing of Rey Mysterio on the belief that he would make as big of an impact as Mysterio did upon his WWE debut. Asai made his WWE debut in dark match victories against Rico, Crash Holly and Shannon Moore as they debuted a series of video packages hyping the debut of Dragon on SmackDown!. He made his WWE television debut at Madison Square Garden on June 26, 2003 episode of SmackDown! in a match with Shannon Moore, where he debuted his finisher, the Asai DDT (a standing shiranui), to the American wrestling audience.

Throughout the summer he competed in a tournament for the WWE United States Championship beating Jamie Noble but losing to eventual winner, Eddie Guerrero. He quickly rebounded by beating Kanyon in a WWE Heat match taped before Vengeance. He then wrestled on WWE Velocity for the next few weeks, leading to a match with Rey Mysterio on SmackDown. Dragon won the match only after Tajiri interfered and showed respect to Dragon due to their Japanese heritage. The next week Dragon teamed with Mysterio to take on Tajiri and Nunzio. After this match, he was not seen on SmackDown! for several months until the build for the Cruiserweight Open at WrestleMania XX. At the event, Dragon participated in the Open. Dragon's WrestleMania resulted in one of WrestleMania's most famous blunders, tripping as he entered the arena from the backstage area and tripping as he was going up the turnbuckle for a pose. The first trip was edited out of the WrestleMania XX DVD, but the second wasn't. After the open, he faced Chavo Guerrero and Nunzio in his last WWE matches. On April 22, 2004, WWE announced that Asai asked for his release from WWE when he knew WWE wanted to unmask him and went back to Japan immediately.

Return to Japan (2004–present)
One month later after being released from WWE, Asai quickly picked up a New Japan tour on May 1, 2004. He has occasionally wrestled for the Consejo Mundial de Lucha Libre. He also took part in the short lived Japanese independent promotion Dragondoor, ran by one of his students Noriaki Kawabata using mostly T2P and Toryumon X graduates. He would wrestle in matches against Último Guerrero and various other stars who wrestled in Mexico or Japanese based lucha libre promotions. Since the fall of Dragondoor he went back to Mexico to run another class of the Toryumon school, which has led to some standouts in Hajime Ohara, Kazuchika Okada and Pequeño Ninja. The rest of the Toryumon students along with Asai joined the Tatsumi Fujinami promoted Dradition promotion in Japan. In 2006, Asai began promoting the annual "Toryumon Mexico: Dragon Mania" wrestling show. He also wrestled at UWA Hardcore Wrestling based outside of Toronto, Ontario, Canada. He has wrestled against Sonjay Dutt, M-Dogg 20, Chris Sabin, Alex Shelley, Jyushin Thunder Liger and Black Tiger all in the UWA. Since then he has been working in Japan for various independent promotions such as Pro Wrestling Kageki and Michinoku Pro. He has also been to Mexico as well as in Spain, working for Nu Wrestling Evolution.

On December 15, 2013, Dragón defeated Yoshinobu Kanemaru to win All Japan Pro Wrestling's World Junior Heavyweight Championship. He lost the title to Atsushi Aoki on May 29, 2014. On August 27, 2017, he regained the title by defeating Tajiri.

On August 30 and 31, 2014, Dragón participated in a show in Pyongyang, North Korea promoted by the Inoki Genome Federation. He defeated Hajime Ohara on the first day and Heddi French on the second in singles matches.

On March 22, 2015, Dragón won another title in All Japan, when he and Yoshinobu Kanemaru defeated Mitsuya Nagai and Takeshi Minamino for the All Asia Tag Team Championship. They vacated the title on October 14.

Acting career
Ultimo Dragon starred in two films in 2008. The first was Bloodstained Memoirs, also starring Chris Jericho, Rob Van Dam, Mick Foley and Keiji Muto. Ultimo Dragon's scenes were filmed in the UK and Italy. The other was Ultimo Dragon, a heroic martial arts story.

Championships and accomplishments
All Japan Pro Wrestling
All Asia Tag Team Championship (1 time) – with Yoshinobu Kanemaru
World Junior Heavyweight Championship (2 times)
Consejo Mundial de Lucha Libre
NWA World Middleweight Championship (2 times)
Comision de Box y Lucha D.F.
Distrito Federal Trios Championship (1 time) – with Naoki Sano and Hirokazu Hata
International Wrestling Revolution Group
Copa Higher Power (1998) – with Judo Suwa, Lyguila, Magnum Tokyo, Ryo Saito, Shiima Nobunaga and Sumo Fujii
International Wrestling Alliance
IWA Heavyweight Championship (1 time)
IWA Junior Heavyweight Championship (1 time)
Michinoku Pro Wrestling
British Commonwealth Junior Heavyweight Championship (1 time)
Tohoku Tag Team Championship (2 times) – with Jinsei Shinzaki (1) and Kesen Numagirolamo (1)
New Japan Pro-Wrestling
IWGP Junior Heavyweight Championship (2 times)
J-Crown (1 time)
British Commonwealth Junior Heavyweight Championship (1 time)
NWA World Junior Heavyweight Championship (1 time)
NWA World Welterweight Championship (2 times)
UWA World Junior Light Heavyweight Championship (1 time)
WAR International Junior Heavyweight Championship (1 time)
WWA World Junior Light Heavyweight Championship (1 time)
WWF Light Heavyweight Championship (1 time)
Pro Wrestling Noah
Differ Cup (2003) – with Yossino
Pro Wrestling Illustrated
Ranked No. 12 of the top 500 singles wrestlers in the PWI 500 in 1997
 Pro Wrestling Revolution
PWR World Heavyweight Championship (1 time)
Tokyo Sports
Technique Award (1992)
Toryumon Mexico
NWA International Junior Heavyweight Championship (2 time, current)
Yamaha Cup (2008) – with Yutaka Yoshie
Yamaha Cup (2012) – with Angélico
Suzuki Cup (2007) – with Kensuke Sasaki and Marco Corleone
Suzuki Cup (2008) – with Alex Koslov and Marco Corleone
Universal Wrestling Association
UWA World Middleweight Championship (5 times)
UWA World Welterweight Championship (1 time)
WWF Light Heavyweight Championship (1 time)
World Championship Wrestling
WCW Cruiserweight Championship (2 times)
WCW World Television Championship (2 times)
Wrestle And Romance / Wrestle Association R
WAR International Junior Heavyweight Championship (2 times)
WAR World Six-Man Tag Team Championship (1 time) – with Nobutaka Araya and Genichiro Tenryu
Wrestling Observer Newsletter awards
Best Wrestling Maneuver (1996) Running Liger bomb
Most Underrated (2003)
Wrestling Observer Newsletter Hall of Fame (Class of 2004)

Luchas de Apuestas record

Notes

References

External links

 Official blog  
 

1966 births
IWGP Junior Heavyweight champions
Japanese male professional wrestlers
Japan–Mexico relations
Living people
Masked wrestlers
NWA/WCW World Television Champions
Professional wrestling executives
Professional wrestling trainers
Sportspeople from Nagoya
20th-century professional wrestlers
21st-century professional wrestlers
All Asia Tag Team Champions
World Junior Heavyweight Champions (AJPW)
WCW/WWE Cruiserweight Champions
NWA World Middleweight Champions
NWA World Welterweight Champions
British Commonwealth Junior Heavyweight Champions
NWA International Junior Heavyweight Champions
Toryumon
UWA World Welterweight Champions
Tohoku Tag Team Champions
UWA World Junior Light Heavyweight Champions
Tenryu Project International Junior Heavyweight Champions
Tenryu Project World 6-Man Tag Team Champions
UWA World Middleweight Champions